Richard Heyne (September 27, 1882, (Offenbach am Main) - March 18, 1961, (Offenbach am Main)) was a Hessian DVP politician and former member of the Landtags des Volksstaates Hessen in the Weimar Republic.

Biography 
Richard Heyne was the son of Kommerzienrat and screw factory owner Georg Heyne (1844-1908) and his wife Regine Johanette (birth name Helger). He was a Protestant and married Helene Roth.

Richard Heyne worked in the county governments of Oppenheim and Worms, most recently in the Executive Council. He was later a manufacturer at the firm Heyne & Co.

References 
 Ruppel, Hans Georg, and Birgit Groß. Hessische Abgeordnete 1820–1930. Darmstadt: n.p., 1980. Print.

1882 births
1961 deaths
German People's Party politicians